Nappi may refer to:

People 
 Chiara Nappi, Italian physicist
 Francesco Nappi (bishop), Roman Catholic prelate
 Frank Nappi, American author
 Laura Nappi, Italian sprinter
 Marco Nappi, Italian footballer
 Michele Nappi, Italian footballer
 Romie Nappi, American mobster
 Valentina Nappi, Italian adult actress

Places 
 Nappi, Guyana, a village in Guyana

Other 
National Pharmaceutical Product Index